Croatia has participated in the biennial classical music competition Eurovision Young Musicians 10 times since its debut in 1994. 

On 8 July 2019, it was announced by the European Broadcasting Union (EBU) that Croatian broadcaster HRT would host the 20th edition of the contest in Zagreb on 21 June 2020. However, on 18 March 2020, it was announced that the event had been postponed indefinitely as a result of the COVID-19 pandemic in Europe. In February 2022, it was confirmed that Croatia would not host this edition of the contest. Although initially not included on the list of participants on 21 February 2022, it was later revealed in June that Croatia would remain in the contest after all.

Participation overview

See also
Croatia in the Eurovision Song Contest
Croatia in the Junior Eurovision Song Contest

Notes

References

External links 
 Eurovision Young Musicians

Countries in the Eurovision Young Musicians